Black Bottom Crater is a volcanic crater located in Arizona, east-northeast of Sunset Crater, and west-southwest of Roden Crater. To the northwest is Strawberry Crater. Black Bottom Crater is a cinder cone in the San Francisco volcanic field.

References

Volcanoes of Arizona
Cinder cones of the United States
Mountains of Coconino County, Arizona